is a passenger railway station located in the city of Iyo, Ehime Prefecture, Japan. It is operated by JR Shikoku and is a junction station with dual station numbers "S06" and "U06". From here the Yosan Line divides into 2 branches. Stations along it  use the "S" prefix. Stations on the newer Uchiko branch use the "U" prefix.

Lines
Connections with other services are needed to travel further east of Matsuyama on the line.

Layout
The station, which is unstaffed, consists of a side platform serving a single elevated track. There is no station building, only a shelter for waiting passengers. Steps lead up to the platform and the station is thus no wheelchair accessible. Bicycle parking is available underneath the elevated station structure.

History
Japanese National Railways (JNR) opened the station on 1 October 1963 as a stop on the existing Yosan Line. At the same time the Uchiko branch was opened and the station became the official start of the branch. With the privatization of JNR on 1 April 1987, control of the station passed to JR Shikoku.

Surrounding area
Matsuyama Expressway Iyo IC
 Japan National Route 56
 Japan National Route 378
 Iyo City Kitayamazaki Elementary School

See also
 List of railway stations in Japan

References

External links
Station timetable

Railway stations in Ehime Prefecture
Railway stations in Japan opened in 1963
Iyo, Ehime